The Soviet Union was a communist state that existed from 1922 until its dissolution of 1991. 

Soviet may also refer to:
Soviet (council), a council
 Supreme Soviet, the highest institution in the hierarchy of councils within the USSR
An adjective for something related to the Soviet Union
 A Soviet citizen, a citizen of the Soviet Union, see Soviet people
Soviet Guard Peak, Anyuy Mountains
Soviet Mountain, Wrangel Island
Soviet (band), American synth-rock band

See also
Sovetsky (disambiguation), Russian adjective for something related to the Soviet Union, Soviet Russia or Soviet regime
Soviet republic (system of government), a subtype of parliamentary republic
Soviet Republic (disambiguation)
Soviet Union (disambiguation)
Soviet democracy
Republics of the Soviet Union
Sovetsk
Supreme Council (disambiguation), including post-Soviet parliaments